Global labor arbitrage is an economic phenomenon where, as a result of the removal of or disintegration of barriers to international trade, jobs move to nations where labor and the cost of doing business (such as environmental regulations) is inexpensive and/or impoverished labor moves to nations with higher paying jobs.

Two common barriers to international trade are tariffs (politically imposed) and the costs of transporting goods across oceans.  With the advent of the Internet, the decrease of the costs of telecommunications, and the possibility of near-instantaneous document transfer, the barriers to the trade of intellectual work product, which is essentially, any kind of work that can be performed on a computer (such as computer programming) or that makes use of a college education, have been greatly reduced.

Often, a prosperous nation (such as the United States) will remove its barriers to international trade, integrating its labor market with those of nations with a lower cost of labor (such as India, China, and Mexico), resulting in a shifting of jobs from the prosperous nation to the developing one. The end result is an increase in the supply of labor relative to the demand for labor, which means a decrease in costs and a decrease in wages. The practice of on-shore labor and offshoring arbitrage is the combined practice of underpaying immigrant labor to suppress wages and mobility of both immigrant and native labor — while sending non-competitive jobs offshore to increase profits.

Forms of global labor arbitrage
Global labor arbitrage can take many forms, including but not limited to:

Foreign outsourcing

Capital moves to nations with cheap labor, lower taxes and or fewer environmental regulations or other costs of doing business for the purpose of producing goods and services for export to other markets. The classic example is the case of a factory or office closing in Nation A and then moving to Nation B for the purpose of producing goods or services at lower labor costs for export back to Nation A's market. This can result in layoffs for workers in Nation A. For example, in the United States, the amount of manufacturing jobs has decreased while the importation of manufactured goods from other nations has increased (along with the United States' trade deficit). These trends are now affecting the service sector as well.

Importation of foreign labor using work visas
Labor, often skilled and educated, moves to a nation on a temporary or permanent basis.  This has the effect of increasing the supply of labor in that nation's market.

This type of labor importation may be advantageous. According to the National Venture Capital Association (NVCA), a registered political action committee, more than 25% of all startups responding to an NVCA survey, in the San Francisco Bay Area of the US in the last 15 years were "immigrant-founded" (most likely former or current H-1Bs). 40% of all publicly traded and venture founded companies in high tech manufacturing were started by immigrants. These account for more than half of all jobs in this sector.

Conversely, the NVCA "American Made," publication makes little mention of US born co-founders, makes an errant claim that Intel has an immigrant founder, resulting in a faulty claim of the following companies employing more than 245,000 people in 2005:
 Intel (co-founders: Gordon Moore-US, Robert Noyce-US)
 Sun Microsystems (1982-2010) (co-founders: Vinod Khosla-India, Andy Bechtolsheim-Germany, Bill Joy-US, Scott McNealy-US)
 Google (co-founders: Larry Page-US, Sergey Brin-Russia)
 Yahoo! (co-founders: David Filo-US, Jerry Yang-Taiwan)
 eBay (founder: Pierre Omidyar-France)

Previous studies authored by Stuart Anderson, of the National Foundation for American Policy,  had been careful to make the distinction of, "...founded or co-founded..." whereas the National Venture Capital Association uses the term, "immigrant-founded" 55 times in its 39-page document. The publication's data tables disclose only the names of "immigrant-born founder or cofounder"; American born co-founders, and the number of American co-founders, are omitted. Additionally, according to Intel Corporation (99,900 employees), Hungarian born CEO Andy Grove was not an Intel co-founder.

Immigration
Impoverished labor moves towards capital in prosperous nations.  This tends to increase the supply of labor relative to capital in the prosperous nations and potentially decreases wages, according to the laws of supply and demand (of and for labor). However, this decrease can be offset by job creation due to talented immigrants, as discussed in the last section.

See also
 Balance of trade
 Absolute advantage
 Global workforce

Notes

Arbitrage
International trade
Global workforce
Offshoring
Economic globalization